DSP Harpreet Singh (Hindi: हरप्रीत सिंह) is an international  Shooter. He hails from Karnal Haryana . He is a police officer of Haryana cadre. Harpreet Singh has won two gold medals in 25m Center Fire Pistol Event at Commonwealth Games 2010 New Delhi and 1 Silver Medal in 25m Rapid Fire Pistol Event at Commonwealth Games 2014 Glasgow, achieving one of the incredible milestone in the sport of shooting. He is amongst the most celebrated shooters of the country. He is defending champion in  CWG in 25 mtr centre fire pistol event since 2010.He has also won BEST SHOOTER trophy for shooting a new meet record( only police officer to reach the podium 05 times during the same meet)  and winning 02 gold and 02 silver medals in 11th All India police services meet-Jan 2018. His medal tally includes more than 150 international medals from common wealth games, South Asian games, Asian shooting championship, ISSF world cup, world championship and Grand pix.

Career
In Commonwealth Games Delhi, Harpreet won 2 gold medals for India.

REPRESENTATION IN INTERNATIONAL

Achievements

ACHIEVEMENTS DETAILS: ALL INDIA POLICE COMPETITION 

WON BEST SHOOTER TROPHY FOR SHOOTING A NEW MEET RECORD AND WINNING 02 GOLD 02 SILVER MEDALS IN 11TH AIPSSC JAN 2018

ACHIEVEMENTS DETAILS: - INTERNATIONAL

ACHIEVEMENTS DETAILS: - NATIONAL

References

1981 births
Asian Games competitors for India
Commonwealth Games gold medallists for India
Commonwealth Games medallists in shooting
Commonwealth Games silver medallists for India
Indian male sport shooters
Indian Navy personnel
Living people
People from Karnal
Shooters at the 2010 Asian Games
Shooters at the 2010 Commonwealth Games
Shooters at the 2014 Asian Games
Shooters at the 2014 Commonwealth Games
Sport shooters from Haryana
Medallists at the 2010 Commonwealth Games
Medallists at the 2014 Commonwealth Games